Lindneromyia is a genus of flat-footed flies (insects in the family Platypezidae). There are at least 70 described species in Lindneromyia.

Species
These 75 species belong to the genus Lindneromyia:

 Lindneromyia abessinica (Oldenberg, 1913)
 Lindneromyia abscondita (Snow, 1895) c g
 Lindneromyia acuminata (Tonnoir, 1925) c g
 Lindneromyia africana Kessel, 1965 c g
 Lindneromyia agarici (Willard, 1914) c g b
 Lindneromyia albomaculata Chandler, 1994 c g
 Lindneromyia angustifrons (Oldenberg, 1917)
 Lindneromyia aquila (Kessel & Clopton, 1970) c g
 Lindneromyia argentifascia Chandler, 1994 c g
 Lindneromyia argyrogyna (Meijere, 1907) c g
 Lindneromyia arnaudi (Kessel & Clopton, 1970) c g
 Lindneromyia austraquila Chandler, 1994 c g
 Lindneromyia balteata (Kessel & Clopton, 1970) c g
 Lindneromyia basilewskyi (Kessel & Clopton, 1970) c g
 Lindneromyia boharti (Kessel & Clopton, 1969) c g
 Lindneromyia brunettii (Kessel & Clopton, 1969) c g
 Lindneromyia brunnescens (Collin, 1931) c g
 Lindneromyia caccabata (Kessel & Clopton, 1970) c g
 Lindneromyia carbonaria (Kessel, 1950) c g
 Lindneromyia cascassi (Bowden, 1979) c g
 Lindneromyia cirrhocera (Czerny, 1930) c g
 Lindneromyia curta Chandler, 1994 c g
 Lindneromyia denticulata (Tonnoir, 1925) c g
 Lindneromyia dianae (Kessel & Clopton, 1970) c g
 Lindneromyia dorsalis (Meigen, 1804) c g
 Lindneromyia fasciventris (Oldenburg, 1917) c g
 Lindneromyia fergusoni (Tonnoir, 1925) c g
 Lindneromyia flavicornis (Loew, 1866) c g b
 Lindneromyia flavipalpis Chandler, 1994 c g
 Lindneromyia fonsecai Chandler, 1994 c g
 Lindneromyia fumapex (Kessel, 1965) c g
 Lindneromyia ghesquierei (Collart, 1950) c
 Lindneromyia glaucescens (Walker, 1859) c g
 Lindneromyia gressitti Chandler, 1994 c g
 Lindneromyia griseola (Tonnoir, 1925) c g
 Lindneromyia hendricksoni (Kessel & Clopton, 1970) c g
 Lindneromyia hirtifacies (Oldenberg, 1917)
 Lindneromyia hungarica Chandler, 2001 c g
 Lindneromyia ilunga (Kessel & Clopton, 1970) c g
 Lindneromyia kandyi Chandler, 1994 c g
 Lindneromyia keiseri (Kessel & Clopton, 1970) c g
 Lindneromyia kerteszi (Oldenberg, 1913)
 Lindneromyia kesseli Bowden, 1973
 Lindneromyia limpukane (Kessel & Clopton, 1970) c g
 Lindneromyia lindneri (Kessel, 1965) c g
 Lindneromyia madagascarensis (Kessel & Clopton, 1970) c g
 Lindneromyia maggioncaldai (Kessel, 1967) c g
 Lindneromyia malagasiensis (Kessel & Clopton, 1970) c g
 Lindneromyia malawiensis (Kessel & Clopton, 1970) c g
 Lindneromyia matilei (Bowden, 1979) c g
 Lindneromyia merimbulae Chandler, 1994 c g
 Lindneromyia minuta (Lindner, 1956) c g
 Lindneromyia mogollonensis (Kessel & Kessel, 1967) c g
 Lindneromyia natalensis (Brunetti, 1929) c g
 Lindneromyia nigella (Shatalkin, 1980) c g
 Lindneromyia pellucens (Aczel, 1958) c g
 Lindneromyia pendleburyi Chandler, 1994 c g
 Lindneromyia peruviana (Oldenberg, 1917)
 Lindneromyia pilosa (Oldenberg, 1917)
 Lindneromyia psephos (Kessel & Clopton, 1970) c g
 Lindneromyia pulchra (Snow, 1894) c g
 Lindneromyia quatei Chandler, 1994 c g
 Lindneromyia steinleyi (Kessel & Clopton, 1970) c g
 Lindneromyia stellae (Kessel & Clopton, 1970) c g
 Lindneromyia stuckenbergi (Kessel & Clopton, 1970) c g
 Lindneromyia ubuhle (Kessel & Clopton, 1970) c g
 Lindneromyia ubumnyma (Kessel & Clopton, 1970) c g
 Lindneromyia ubusuku (Kessel & Clopton, 1970) c g
 Lindneromyia umbrosa (Snow, 1894) c g
 Lindneromyia umusi (Kessel & Clopton, 1970) c g
 Lindneromyia umzimkulwana (Kessel & Clopton, 1970) c g
 Lindneromyia ussuriensis (Shatalkin, 1993) c g
 Lindneromyia waui Chandler, 1994 c g
 Lindneromyia wheeleri (Kessel & Kessel, 1967) c g
 Lindneromyia wulpii (Kertész, 1899) c g

Data sources: i = ITIS, c = Catalogue of Life, g = GBIF, b = Bugguide.net

References

Further reading

External links

 
 

Platypezidae
Platypezoidea genera
Taxa named by Edward L. Kessel